Akamai Technologies, Inc. is an American content delivery network (CDN), cybersecurity, and cloud service company, providing web and Internet security services. Akamai's Intelligent Edge Platform is one of the world's largest distributed computing platforms. The company operates a network of servers worldwide and rents capacity of the servers to customers wanting to increase efficiency of their websites by using Akamai owned servers located near the user. When a user navigates to the URL of an Akamai customer, their browser is directed by Akamai's domain name system to a proximal edge server that can serve the requested content. Akamai's mapping system assigns each user to a proximal edge server using sophisticated algorithms such as stable matching and consistent hashing, enabling more reliable and faster web downloads. Further, Akamai implements DDoS mitigation and other security services in its edge server platform. On the 25th year of creation of Akamai's edge, its role in the evolution of content delivery, edge computing, edge security services, overlay networking, IP geolocation and other internet technologies was noted in an episode of ACM SIGCOMM's Networking Channel.

History 
The company was named after akamai, which means 'clever,' or more colloquially, 'cool' in Hawaiian, which Lewin had discovered in a Hawaiian-English dictionary after the suggestion of a colleague.

Akamai Technologies entered the 1998 MIT $50K competition with a business proposition based on their research on consistent hashing, and were selected as one of the finalists. By August 1998, they had developed a working prototype, and with the help of Jonathan Seelig and Randall Kaplan, they began taking steps to incorporate the company.
 
In late 1998 and early 1999, a group of business professionals and scientists joined the founding team. Most notably, Paul Sagan, former president of New Media for Time Inc., and George Conrades, former chairman and chief executive officer of BBN Corp. and senior vice president of US operations for IBM. Conrades became the chief executive officer of Akamai in April 1999. The company launched its commercial service in April 1999 and was listed on the NASDAQ Stock Market from October 29, 1999.
 
On July 1, 2001, Akamai was added to the Russell 3000 Index and Russell 2000 Index.

On September 11, 2001, co-founder Daniel M. Lewin died in the September 11 attacks at the age of 31 when he was stabbed by one of hijackers. He was seated closest to the hijackers and attempted to foil the hijacking during his flight aboard American Airlines Flight 11, the first plane to crash into the World Trade Center.

In 2005, Paul Sagan was named chief executive officer of Akamai, taking over from Conrades. Sagan worked to differentiate Akamai from its competitors by expanding the company's breadth of services. Under his leadership, the company grew to $1.37 billion in revenue.

In July 2007, Akamai was added to the S&P 500 Index.

In 2013, co-founder Tom Leighton was elected to the position of chief executive officer, replacing Sagan. 

On February 9, 2021, Akamai announced it would reorganize into two internal groups: Security Technology and Edge Technology. The company also re-established the role of chief technology officer, and named Robert Blumofe to serve in that role. Long-time chief security officer (CSO) Andy Ellis announced he would leave in March 2021.

Akamai's headquarters are in Kendall Square. Akamai started in Technology Square and later expanded to multiple buildings in Cambridge Center. They consolidated their offices in a purpose-built building at 145 Broadway in December 2019.

Technologies

Akamai Intelligent Edge Platform
The Akamai Intelligent Platform is a distributed cloud computing platform that operates worldwide. It is a network of over approximately 365,000 servers deployed in more than 135 countries. These servers reside in roughly 1,350 of the world's networks gathering real-time information about traffic, congestion, and trouble spots. Each Akamai server is equipped with proprietary software that uses complex algorithms to process requests from nearby users, then serve the requested content.

Content delivery process

The content delivery process begins with a user submitting a request to a browser. When a user enters a URL, a DNS request is triggered to Akamai's authoritative DNS  and an IP address is retrieved. With the IP address, the browser can then directly contact the Akamai edge server for subsequent requests. In a content delivery network (CDN) structure, the domain name of the URL is translated by the mapping system into the IP address of an edge server to serve the content to the user.

Akamai delivers web content over its Intelligent Platform by transparently mirroring elements such as HTML, CSS, software downloads, and media objects from customers' servers. The Akamai server is automatically chosen depending on the type of content and the user's network location. Said servers are located in more than 200 countries and territories. Receiving content from an Akamai server, near the user, allows faster downloads and less vulnerability to network congestion. Akamai claims to provide better scalability by delivering the content over the last mile from servers close to end-users, avoiding the middle-mile bottleneck of the Internet. The Download Delivery product line includes HTTP downloads for large downloadable objects, a customizable application for consumers, and analytics tools with metrics that monitor and report on the download process.

Peer-to-peer networking
In addition to using Akamai's own servers, Akamai delivers certain content from other end-users' computers, in a form of peer-to-peer networking.

Network Operations Command Center
Akamai's Network Operations Command Center (NOCC) is used for proactive monitoring and troubleshooting of all servers in the global Akamai network. The NOCC provides real-time statistics of Akamai's web traffic. The traffic metrics update automatically and provide a view of the Internet traffic conditions on Akamai's servers and customer websites.

State of the Internet
Akamai releases quarterly a report called the State of the Internet, which is based on data gathered from its Intelligent Platform. The platform provides global Internet statistics such as connection speed, broadband adoption, attack traffic, network connectivity, and mobile connectivity.

Visualizing the Internet
Akamai's data visualization tools display how data is moving across the Internet in real-time. Viewers are able to see global web conditions, malicious attack traffic, and Internet connectivity. In addition, the net usage indices monitor global news consumption, industry-specific traffic, and mobile trends.  Akamai also offers the Internet Visualization application, which allows users to view real-time data on their mobile device.

OPEN Initiative
On October 9, 2013, Akamai announced its Open Initiative at the 2013 Akamai Edge Conference. OPEN allows customers and partners to develop and customize the way they interact with the Akamai Intelligent Platform. Key components of OPEN include system and development operations integration, real-time big data integration, and a single-point user interface.

Plume Partnership
In January 2021, Akamai partnered with Plume. The partnership combines Akamai Security and Personalization Services (SPS) mobile security suite and real time threat intelligence with Plume's Consumer Experience Management (CEM) Platform.

Primary domains
Akamai Technologies owns about 60 other domains, but the primary domains it uses include:

Corporate
 akamai.com – Akamai's domain

Content (delivery) domains
 akamai.net
 akamaiedge.net
 akamaihd.net
 edgesuite.net
 edgekey.net
 srip.net
 akamaitechnologies.com
 akamaitechnologies.fr

DNS servers
 akamaitech.net
 akadns.net
 akagtm.org
 akam.net
 akamaistream.net
 akamaiedge.net
 akamaihd.net
 akamai.com

Customers 
On July 21, 1999, at Macworld Expo New York, Apple and Akamai announced a strategic partnership to build Apple's new media network, QuickTime TV (QTV), based on QuickTime Streaming Server. Both companies later announced that Apple had made a $12.5 million investment in the company the previous month. Apple continues to use Akamai as their primary CDN for a wide range of applications including software downloads from Apple's Website, QuickTime movie trailers, and the iTunes Store.

In September 1999, Microsoft and Akamai formed a strategic relationship to incorporate Windows Media technology in Akamai's FreeFlow service, as well as to facilitate the porting of the FreeFlow product to the Windows platform; this relationship exists to this day. Microsoft Azure offers Akamai (along with Verizon) as options for its "standard" CDN service.

Arabic news network Al-Jazeera was a customer from March 28, 2003, until April 2, 2003, when Akamai decided to end the relationship. The network's English-language managing editor claimed this was due to political pressure.

In June 2008, The NewsMarket teamed with Akamai to accelerate dynamic content and applications to global media ahead of the Beijing Olympics.

The BBC iPlayer uses Akamai to stream its recorded and live programs, focused through an XML playlist.

The entire China Central Television website, including its streaming video, has been hosted on Akamai's edge servers since late 2009. Hulu uses Akamai for hosting video. MIT OpenCourseWare utilizes Akamai's EdgeSuite for its CDN.

Trend Micro uses Akamai for their Housecall antivirus application.

Valve's Steam service uses Akamai's CDN for storing screenshots and icons uploaded by users.

Akamai provided streaming services to ESPN Star (India) during the course of the ICC Cricket World Cup 2011.

Rackspace's Cloud Files use Akamai's CDN for storing its customer's files.

Other customers include Adobe Systems, Airbnb, AMD, AutoTrader.com, COS, ESPN, The Great Courses, Hewlett-Packard, Hilton Worldwide, IBM, J. C. Penney, Jehovah's Witnesses, MTV Networks, NASA, National Academy of Recording Arts and Sciences, NBC Sports, Pearson Education, Red Bull GmbH, Red Hat, Sony PlayStation and Yahoo!.

Nintendo uses Akamai's Media Delivery Solutions for the Nintendo Switch Online service as well as in their mobile apps, like Super Mario Run.

Acquisitions
 On February 10, 2000, Akamai acquired Network24 Communications for 621,000 shares of common stock and $12.5 million in cash.
 On April 20, 2000, Akamai acquired InterVU Inc. for 10.0 million shares of common stock.
 On July 25, 2000, Akamai acquired CallTheShots, Inc., for an aggregate purchase price of $3,700,000.
 On June 10, 2005, Akamai acquired  Speedera Networks, Inc. for 10.6 million shares of Akamai common stock and options to purchase 1.7 million shares of Akamai common stock.
 On December 13, 2006, Akamai acquired Nine Systems, Inc., for an aggregate purchase price of $157,500,000.
 On March 13, 2007, Akamai acquired Netli Inc. (Netli), for an aggregate purchase price of $154,400,000.
 On April 12, 2007, Akamai acquired Red Swoosh Inc. for an aggregate purchase price of $18,700,000.
 On November 3, 2008, Akamai acquired aCerno Inc., for an aggregate purchase price of $90,800,000.
 On June 10, 2010, Akamai acquired Velocitude LLC, for an aggregate purchase price of $12,000,000.
 On February 7, 2012, Akamai acquired Blaze Software, Inc., for an aggregate purchase price of $19,300,000.
 On March 6, 2012, Akamai acquired Cotendo, Inc., for an aggregate purchase price of $278,900,000.
 On September 13, 2012, Akamai acquired FastSoft, Inc., for an aggregate purchase price of $14,400,000.
 On December 4, 2012, Akamai acquired Verivue, Inc., for an aggregate purchase price of $30,900,000.
 On November 8, 2013, Akamai acquired Velocius Networks for an aggregate purchase price of  $4,300,000.
 In February 2014, Akamai acquired cyber security provider, Prolexic Technologies for an aggregate purchase price of $390,000,000.
 In February 2015, Akamai acquired Xerocole Inc., a domain name system technology company.
 On April 6, 2015, Akamai acquired cloud OTT IPTV service provider Octoshape, for an undisclosed amount.
 On November 2, 2015, Akamai acquired Bloxx, a provider of Secure Web Gateway (SWG) technology, for an undisclosed amount.
 On September 28, 2016, Akamai acquired Concord Systems, a provider of technology for the high performance processing of data at scale, for an undisclosed amount.
 On October 4, 2016, Akamai acquired Soha Systems, an enterprise secure access delivered as a service provider, for an undisclosed amount.
 On December 19, 2016, Akamai acquired Cyberfend, a bot and automation detection solutions provider, for an undisclosed amount.
 On March 29, 2017, Akamai acquired SOASTA, a digital performance management company based in Mountain View, CA, for an undisclosed all-cash amount.
 On October 11, 2017, Akamai acquired Nominum, a carrier-grade DNS and DHCP provider and one of the major players in the creation of the modern DNS, for an undisclosed all-cash amount.
In October 2019, Akamai acquired security software provider ChameleonX for $20 million.
 On January 24, 2019, Akamai acquired CIAM provider Janrain.
On October 27, 2020, Akamai acquired IoT and mobile security provider Asavie.
On February 1, 2021, Akamai acquired Inverse Inc. a Montreal Canadian based security company making an open source Network Access Controller (NAC) called PacketFence.
On September 29, 2021 Akamai Technologies Acquired Guardicore for $600 Million.
On February 15, 2022 Akamai acquired Linode for $900 Million.

Litigation

One of Akamai's patents covers delivering electronic data using a CDN. Internet Web site proprietors (content providers) contract with Akamai to deliver their Web sites' content to individual Internet users. The patented method permits large files, such as video or music files, to be stored on Akamai's servers and accessed from those servers by Internet users. This increases the speed with which Internet users access the content from Web sites.

Akamai's patent was written in a way that called for or permitted actions by multiple persons or entities—such as the content-provider customer and the company providing the CDN service. Akamai's competitor Limelight chose to operate its allegedly infringing service in that manner—it performed most steps of the patented process, and its customers performed a so-called tagging step. Under the interpretation of patent law, when Akamai decided to sue Limelight for patent infringement, a method patent could be infringed upon only when a single actor performed all the steps. The court, therefore, overturned a $40 million jury verdict in Akamai's favor.

Akamai initially lost the case, even taking it to the Supreme Court. The Supreme Court returned the case to the United States Court of Appeals for the Federal Circuit, however, with an invitation to re-evaluate its rule, if it chose to do so, that all the steps of a method had to be performed by a single actor for there to be infringement. On remand, the Federal Circuit considered the matter en banc (all active circuit judges) and modified its rule. It now held that a patent could also be directly infringed upon if "an alleged infringer conditions participation in an activity or receipt of a benefit upon performance of a step or steps of a patented method and establishes the manner or timing of that performance". On that basis, the Federal Circuit reinstated the $40 million jury verdict. It said that "Akamai presented substantial evidence demonstrating that Limelight conditions its customers' use of its CDN upon its customers' performance of" the steps that Limelight does not itself perform. This has been considered a substantial change in patent law. The case is Akamai Techs., Inc. v. Limelight Networks, Inc..

Controversies

In 2013, the Securities and Exchange Commission charged a former executive at Akamai Technologies for illegally tipping non-public information about the company's financial predicament as part of the insider trading scheme operated by now-imprisoned Galleon Management hedge fund founder Raj Rajaratnam.

The National Security Agency and Federal Bureau of Investigation have reportedly used Facebook's Akamai CDN to collect information on Facebook users.  This report appears to show intelligence analysts intercepting communications between Facebook and its CDN provider, but does not indicate Akamai as being complicit in this process.

According to researchers from the Universities of Cambridge and California-Berkeley, University College London, and International Computer Science Institute-Berkeley, Akamai has been blocking access to web sites for visitors using Tor. This feature, known as 'network lists,' is optional for and implemented by customers of Akamai, and is a feature common to many major IT vendors that provide network security feeds, such as Emerging Threats, which provides such a feed for free.

Key scientific publications 

These papers that appear in scientific conferences and journals, are describing Akamai's technology in greater detail.

 Karger, D., Lehman, E., Leighton, T., Panigrahy, R., Levine, M., Lewin, D. Consistent Hashing and Random Trees: Distributed Caching Protocols for Relieving Hot Spots on the World Wide Web. ACM Symposium on Theory of Computing, 1997, pp. 654–663.
 J. Dilley, B. Maggs, J. Parikh, H. Prokop, R. Sitaraman, and B. Weihl. "Globally Distributed Content Delivery", IEEE Internet Computing, September/October 2002, pp. 50-58.
 Erik Nygren, Ramesh K. Sitaraman, and Jennifer Sun. "The Akamai Network: A Platform for High-Performance Internet Applications". ACM SIGOPS Operating Systems Review, Vol. 44, No. 3, July 2010.
 Bruce Maggs and Ramesh Sitaraman. "Algorithmic nuggets in content delivery".  ACM SIGCOMM Computer Communication Review, Volume=45, Issue=3, 2015.
 F. Chen, R. Sitaraman, and M. Torres. "End-User Mapping: Next Generation Request Routing for Content Delivery". ACM SIGCOMM conference, Aug 2015.
 Kyle Schomp, Onkar Bhardwaj, Eymen Kurdoglu, Mashooq Muhaimen, and Ramesh K. Sitaraman. "Akamai DNS: Providing Authoritative Answers to the World's Queries", ``ACM SIGCOMM conference, Aug 2020.
D. Gillman, Y. Lin, B. Maggs and R. K. Sitaraman. "Protecting Websites from Attack with Secure Delivery Networks", IEEE Computer, vol. 48, no. 4, pp. 26-34, Apr. 2015.

Notable people 
 

Martin McKeay (born 1971), computer security expert and blogger

See also 

 Akamai Techs., Inc. v. Limelight Networks, Inc.

References

External links
 

Internet technology companies of the United States
Companies listed on the Nasdaq
American companies established in 1998
Computer companies established in 1998
Technology companies based in the Boston area
Companies based in Cambridge, Massachusetts
Content delivery networks
Cloud computing providers

1998 establishments in Massachusetts
1999 initial public offerings
Apple Inc. partnerships